South Korea, as Republic of Korea, competed at the 1972 Winter Olympics in Sapporo, Japan.

Figure skating

Women

Speed skating

Men

Women

References
Official Olympic Reports

Korea, South
1972
1972 in South Korean sport